Lockwood Historic District is a national historic district located at Lockwood, Nicholas County, West Virginia, United States. The district includes 26 contributing buildings and 1 contributing site.  The district encompasses the community of Lockwood.  All the buildings are of frame or log construction. Notable buildings include the Fairview Baptist Church (1916), Summers Residence (1990), Gay Grose House (c. 1890), and Hill House (c. 1861).  Also included are the Summers Cemetery and the Morris grave site and monument.

It was listed on the National Register of Historic Places in 1998.

References

National Register of Historic Places in Nicholas County, West Virginia
Historic districts on the National Register of Historic Places in West Virginia
Buildings and structures in Nicholas County, West Virginia
Stick-Eastlake architecture in West Virginia
Colonial Revival architecture in West Virginia
Federal architecture in West Virginia
Historic districts in Nicholas County, West Virginia